Essential Alison Krauss is the first official greatest hits album by American country music and bluegrass music artist Alison Krauss. The album, which was released on July 7, 2009, was only released outside North America. It was issued by Decca Records UK. The album is composed of songs that Krauss handpicked herself.

Track listing
 "Simple Love" (Sarah Siskind) — 4:44
 "Sister Rosetta Goes Before Us" (Sam Phillips) — 3:23
 "Let Me Touch You For a While" (Robert Lee Castleman) — 3:20
 "The Lucky One" (Castleman) — 3:10
 "So Long, So Wrong" (Patrick Brayer, Walden Dahl) — 3:26
 "Empty Hearts" (Michael Johnson, Michael McDonald) — 3:23
 "Every Time You Say Goodbye" (John Pennell) — 3:16
 "Wish I Still Had You" (Sidney Cox) — 4:58
 live version
 "Broadway" (Cox, Suzanne Cox) — 3:58
 "Baby, Now That I've Found You" (Tony Macaulay, John MacLeod) — 3:54
 live version
 "Sawing on the Strings" (Lewis Compton) — 3:02
 "Restless" (Castleman) — 2:57
 "When You Say Nothing at All" (Paul Overstreet, Don Schlitz) — 3:53
 live version
 "A Living Prayer" (Ron Block) — 3:35

Chart performance

Certifications and sales

References

2009 greatest hits albums
Alison Krauss & Union Station albums
Decca Records compilation albums